The 2010 Oregon Ducks football team represented the University of Oregon in the 2010 NCAA Division I FBS football season. The team was led by Chip Kelly in his second season as a head coach. The Ducks played their home games at Autzen Stadium for the 44th straight year.

On October 16, 2010, Oregon was ranked number 1 in the AP Poll for the first time in program history.  On October 31, 2010, after beating USC and moving to 8–0, Oregon achieved the number 1 ranking in the BCS rankings. The Ducks repeated as Pac-10 Conference champions and finished the regular season undefeated with a school-record 12 wins, the first undefeated and untied regular season in the school's 117-year football history. They earned a berth in the BCS National Championship Game, which they narrowly lost to Auburn on a field goal as time expired.  It was the closest that a team from the Pacific Northwest has come to winning a share of the national championship since Washington was crowned national champion by most outlets in 1991.

In recognition of the team's performance during the season, Kelly received the Eddie Robinson Award and the Associated Press College Football Coach of the Year Award. Running back LaMichael James, who finished third in balloting in for the Heisman Trophy, received the Doak Walker Award.

Before the season
The team was plagued with numerous off-field incidents during the off-season, which saw nine separate players either be dismissed from the team or be involved in criminal activities starting in January 2010. On March 12, 2010, Coach Chip Kelly suspended starting quarterback Jeremiah Masoli for the 2010 season for his role in an Oregon fraternity house theft that resulted in a guilty plea to misdemeanor second-degree burglary, and left the option for Masoli to redshirt in 2010 and return to the Ducks in 2011.  On the same day Kelly also suspended LaMichael James and Rob Beard for the season opener after pleading guilty to harassment. The trend continued into the summer time, as on June 7, 2010 suspended Oregon QB, Jeremiah Masoli, was arrested for a second time for marijuana possession and driving with a suspended license. Two days later Masoli was dismissed from the football program. with the Ducks naming sophomore Darron Thomas the starting quarterback.

On March 19, 2010, athletic director Mike Bellotti left Oregon to join the cable sports network, ESPN, as a football analyst.

Recruiting

Schedule

University of Oregon official schedule

Roster
On March 12, 2010, it was announced that 2008–09 starting quarterback Jeremiah Masoli would be suspended for the entire season following his guilty plea for burglary. He was dismissed from the football program on June 9 for an arrest while on his current suspension.

On November 10, 2010, back-up quarterback Nate Costa was ruled out for the season with a knee injury.

Darron Thomas took over as QB and played against Cam Newton in the BCS National Championship game.

Rankings

Game summaries

New Mexico

In the first-ever meeting between Oregon and New Mexico on the football field, the Ducks were victorious 72–0. With first-string tailback LaMichael James serving a one-game suspension by Chip Kelly, Kenjon Barner received the majority of carries offensively for the Ducks. Barner scored 5 touchdowns with only limited carries in the second quarter. Meanwhile, second-string punt returner Cliff Harris tied an Oregon Duck school record by returning the first two punts of his career for touchdowns. After the game, the Pac-10 announced Barner and Harris as players of the week.

Tennessee

Oregon faced Tennessee for the first time, with the teams playing at Neyland Stadium. The game was delayed for over an hour to lightning in the Knoxville area. The Volunteers jumped to a 6–0 lead until the first quarter delay. After the delay, the Ducks fell behind even more, 13–3. Despite falling behind early, Oregon took control in the 2nd half to win by 5 touchdowns.

Portland State

On September 18, Oregon defeated Portland State 69–0. LaMichael James rushed for 227 yards on 14 carries and scored two touchdowns. Quarterback Darron Thomas completed 4 passing touchdowns with one interception and one fumble. No Ducks received Pac-10 player of the week honors for their performance, however.

Arizona State

On September 25, 2010, Oregon defeated Arizona State in Tempe, Arizona by a score of 42–31. Arizona State took an early lead in the game, but Oregon responded with a season-high 4 team interceptions. The Sun Devils held primary running back LaMichael James to only 114 rushing yards, but the total was enough to move James past the 2,000 yard mark for his career. Oregon quarterback Darron Thomas had 290 passing yards in the game, including a 61-yard pass to tight end David Paulson, which were career longs for both players. The win moved the Ducks from 5th to 4th in the September 27 AP Poll.

Stanford

    
    
    
    
    
    
    
    
    
    
    
    
    

The Ducks and Cardinal entered the game ranked 4th and 9th in the AP Poll, respectively. Stanford surged to an early 21–3 lead after the Cardinal recovered a fumbled kickoff return by Cliff Harris. Shortly thereafter, the Ducks would respond with a touchdown and recover a surprise on-side kickoff by specialist Rob Beard. With those scores, the Ducks gained momentum, outscoring Stanford 49–10 to close the game with a 52–31 victory. Turnovers were critical in the game as Stanford quarterback Andrew Luck was intercepted twice by defensive back Cliff Harris—opportunities upon which LaMichael James would then translate into touchdowns. James finished the day with over 250 rushing, moving him into 8th place all-time in Oregon's career rushing standings. Oregon quarterback Darron Thomas contributed 4 total offensive touchdowns and 355 yards of offense. The win was the 13th straight victory for Oregon in Autzen Stadium and helped move the Ducks into third place in the AP Poll.

Washington State

The Ducks went into this game as highly touted favorites, however they had to convert on 4th down twice in the opening drive to score. Backup running back Kenjon Barner suffered a big hit during a kickoff return and had to be carted off. Quarterback Darron Thomas suffered an injury to his right shoulder and was replaced by Nate Costa. Casey Matthews suffered an ankle injury but was able to continue playing.  The Ducks moved up to No. 2 in the rankings after Alabama lost to South Carolina.

UCLA

The Ducks started the game on defense and stalled a UCLA drive that was going well and racked up 15 first quarter points and held UCLA to 6 points going into the 4th quarter.  Darron Thomas played his best game to date completing 22 of 31 passes for 308 yards 3 TD and no interceptions.  LaMichael James rushed for 123 yards and 2 touchdowns.  UCLA was only able to manage 290 total yards versus 582 yards by the Ducks.

USC

Jeff Maehl stepped up and caught 8 passes for 145 yards and 3 TD's.  LaMichael James rushed for 239 yards including a 42-yard scamper in the 2nd quarter.  Thomas threw for 288 yards and four touchdowns.  The performance moved the Ducks to a top BCS ranking for the first time in school history.

Washington

The Huskies entered the game without star quarterback Jake Locker on the road.  Kenjon Barner also returned to the lineup for the Ducks after recovering from a concussion suffered against Washington State.  The Ducks started slowly, being held scoreless in the first quarter, but wound up routing Washington  53–16.

California

The Ducks had not won in Berkeley since 2001 and Cal had been extremely dominant at home. The Bears began their first possession with good field position at the Oregon 48-yard line and behind Shane Vereen, were able to put together a drive that he finished off with a 2-yard touchdown run. The Oregon offense was held scoreless for the second week in a row, and the Ducks did not score until more than halfway through the second quarter on a 64-yard punt return for a touchdown by Cliff Harris, with a successful 2-point conversion. The Ducks failed to add to their lead when a 37-yard field goal attempt missed.

The third quarter opened with a fumble by Vereen that Oregon recovered. Darron Thomas then connected with Jeff Maehl for a 29-yard touchdown, the Ducks' sole offensive touchdown of the game. A second Oregon field goal attempt, this one from 48 yards, missed. The final score of the game came when Thomas was sacked by Cal nose guard Derrick Hill on the Oregon 12-yard line and fumbled, with Hill recovering the fumble for a touchdown. The Bears were unable to tie the score when a 2-point conversion failed. Cal had a chance to take the lead to open the fourth quarter, but kicker Giorgio Tavecchio was penalized for an illegal motion after making a 24-yard attempt, then missed on the subsequent 29-yard attempt. After the game, Tevecchio suggested that the noise caused by visiting Oregon fans contributed to the disruption of the kicking team's rhythm. After getting the ball back with nine and a half minutes left in the game, Oregon never relinquished the ball, sustaining a time-consuming drive that ended with Thomas taking three straight knees at Cal's 11-yard line to preserve the win and stave off an upset.

The Oregon offense was held to a season-low 317 yards, with LaMichael James, the leading rusher in the country, held to 91 yards, while Darron Thomas threw for 155 and a score. In his second career start, Cal quarterback Brock Mansion threw for only 69 yards as the Bears were unable to mount an effective offense with the exception of Shane Vereen, who rushed for 112 yards and a touchdown. After the game Cal head coach Jeff Tedford denied that his players had faked injuries in order to slow down the Oregon offense, a tactic Oregon's opponents were accused of all season. On November 27, defensive line coach Tosh Lupoi was suspended for Cal's final season game for instructing a player to fake an injury during the matchup against Oregon. Lupoi was determined to have been the only person involved in such behavior.

Arizona

Oregon once again started slow in the first half and took off in the second half.  The first half featured two Darron Thomas touchdowns as the Wildcats played well.  Both sides were heavily penalized as Adam Hall of Arizona was flagged for two personal fouls.  The second half's opening Duck drive began with an option pitch to Josh Huff that went for the longest single play of all year.  Arizona only managed 10 second-half points, but they did score a touchdown in the fourth quarter as Oregon racked up 35 second-half points.  LaMichael James rushed for 126 yards and 2 touchdowns, surpassing LeGarrette Blount's single-season scoring record.  With the win over Arizona the Ducks have their best start in history and matched 2001's team school record 11 wins.

Oregon State

The 114th meeting between the two teams in the rivalry came with high stakes for both sides. With a Rose Bowl berth already secured, the Oregon Ducks were playing for a spot in the BCS National Championship Game and the Oregon State Beavers were playing to earn a bowl berth by not finishing below a .500 win–loss record. The TCU Horned Frogs also had a vested interest in the game as they needed the Ducks to lose the game in order to be considered for the National Championship Game. The Beavers wore their throwback uniforms that paid tribute to their 1967 "Giant Killers" team.

The game proved to be intense from the very first play when Oregon linebacker Casey Matthews hit the Beavers' quarterback Ryan Katz hard, causing him to sit out for the drive. Oregon State scored first with a touchdown with 3:23 left in the first quarter, but would not score another touchdown until roughly the last minute in the game when victory was already out of reach. By halftime, the Ducks were up 16–7.

In the third quarter, a touchdown pass from Ducks quarterback Darron Thomas to wide receiver DJ Davis was set up by a fake punt where upback Michael Clay took the snap and ran up the center for a 64-yard gain. The Beavers were able to whittle the Ducks' lead down with two field goals but the Ducks scored two consecutive touchdowns in the fourth quarter. The Beavers scored a touchdown with 1:18 left in the game and attempted an onside kick, but the Ducks recovered the football and took two knees to secure their spot in the National Championship Game.

Auburn (BCS National Championship Game) 

This was the first meeting between the two schools.  Coming into the game, Auburn had a 5–3 record against Pac-10 teams while Oregon was 4–4 against the SEC.  The game was expected be a high-scoring shootout between two high-powered offenses, and while the teams combined for nearly 1,000 yards of total offense, both teams amassed their second-lowest point totals for the 2010 season.

After a scoreless first quarter, Oregon went ahead 3–0 early in the second quarter on a 26-yard field goal by Rob Beard.  On their next offensive possession, Auburn went ahead 7–3.  Heisman Trophy winner Cam Newton completed a 35-yard touchdown pass to former quarterback Kodi Burns and a successful PAT kick by Wes Byrum with 12:00 remaining in the first half.  Oregon quickly retook the lead, scoring on 8-yard touchdown pass from Darron Thomas to LaMichael James and a two-point conversion run by Beard, the kicker, making the score 11–7 in favor of the Ducks with 10:58 remaining in the first half.

The Tigers cut the deficit to two points when Mike Blanc tackled James in the end zone for a safety with 3:26 remaining in the half, making the score 11–9.  They took the lead on a 30-yard touchdown pass from Newton to Emory Blake with 1:47 left in the first half.  Byrum's successful PAT made the score 16–11.

The only score in the third quarter came on a 28-yard field goal by Byrum.  Auburn held onto its eight-point lead until Oregon's LaMichael James caught a two-yard touchdown pass from Darron Thomas with 2:33 remaining in the fourth quarter and another successful two-point conversion tied the score at 19–19 and gave Auburn one last chance to win the game. With 2:17 to play, the game-deciding play occurred on a Tigers first down from their own 40, where freshman running back Michael Dyer received a handoff and appeared to be tackled by Eddie Pleasant at the 46-yard-line. However, none of the referees blew their whistle, ruling that since Dyer had rolled over the top of Pleasant and his knee never touched the ground, he was not down. While the Oregon defenders and most of the Auburn players began lining up for the next play, Dyer took off down the sideline after a moment's hesitation and ran all the way to the Oregon 23, turning what looked like a 6-yard play into a 37-yard gain that set Auburn up well into field goal range. All senior kicker Wes Byrum had to do was kick a 19-yard field goal as time expired to give Auburn its first BCS National Championship and its second national championship officially recognized by Auburn.

Dyer's run became a highly controversial play, with some arguing that since part of Dyer's ankle and lower leg touched the ground, he should have been down by rule.

RB Michael Dyer and DT Nick Fairley were voted offensive and defensive most-valuable-player respectively.

Notes
The Ducks led the conference in scoring offense (592 points, 49.3 average), rushing offense (42 touchdowns, 303.8 yards per game), rushing defense (11 touchdowns, 117.6 yards per game), and total offense (71 touchdowns, 537.5 yards per game). The team is led by tailback LaMichael James, who tops the conference with 1682 yards on 281 carries, 21 touchdowns and averaging 152.9 yards per game. His longest carry was for 76 yards.

Awards and honors
Eddie Robinson Coach of the Year and Associated Press College Football Coach of the Year
Chip Kelly

Doak Walker Award
LaMichael James, RB

Coaching staff
Chip Kelly – Head Coach
Steve Greatwood – Offensive Line
Nick Aliotti – Defensive Coordinator
Mark Helfrich – Offensive Coordinator
Gary Campbell – Running Backs
Jerry Azzinaro – Defensive Line
John Neal – Secondary
Tom Osborne – Tight Ends & Special Teams
Don Pellum – Linebackers & Recruiting Coordinator
Scott Frost – Wide Receivers
Jim Radcliffe – Head Strength and Conditioning Coach
Alex Miller – Graduate Assistant Coach
Peter Sirmon – Graduate Assistant Coach
Jeff Hawkins – Senior Associate Athletics Director, Football Operations
Kyle Wiest – Asst. Director of Football Operations
Jim Fisher – Asst. Director of Football Operations/Recruiting

Statistics

LaMichael James Rushing Statistics
294 carries:. 1731 yards:. 5.9 Yards/Carry:.    21 Touchdowns:. 
LaMichael James Receiving Statistics
17 Receptions:. 208 Yards:. 12.2 Yards/Catch:. 3 Receiving Touchdowns
LaMichael James Scrimmage Stats
311 Plays:. 1939 Yards:. 6.2 AVG:. 24 Touchdowns
Darron Thomas Passing Statistics
222 completions:. 361 Pass Attempts:. 61.5 Completion % :. 2881 Yards:. 8 Yards/Attempt:. 30 Touchdowns:. 9 Interceptions:. 151 QB Rate
Darron Thomas Rushing Statistics
93 Carries:. 486 Yards:. 5.2 Yards/Carry:. 5 Touchdowns
Jeff Maehl Receiving Stats
77 Catches:. 1076 Yards:. 14 Yards/Catch:. 12 Receiving Touchdowns
OREGON TOTAL STATS
Offense:
42 Rushing Touchdowns
34 Receiving Touchdowns
76 Touchdowns From Scrimmage
3758 Rushing Yards
613 Carries
6.13 Yards/Carry
3648 Receiving Yards
290 Catches
12.58 Yards/ Catch
7406 Yards from Scrimmage
Kick & Punt Returns
-46 Kick Returns
984 Yards
21.4 AVG
-40 Punt Returns
679 Yards
16.975 AVG
5 Return Touchdowns
Kicking & Punting
Rob Beard Kicking Statistics
63 XPM:. 64 XPA:. 98.4 XP% :. 10 FGM:. 13 FGA:. 76.9 FG% :. 93 Points
Jackson Rice Punting Statistics
40 Punts:. 1691 Yards:. 42.3 AVG
SCORING
LaMichael James 144 Points
Rob Beard 93 Points
Jeff Maehl 72 Points
Kenjon Barner 54 Points
Cliff Harris 30 Points
Josh Huff 30 Points
Darron Thomas 30 Points
Remene Alston 30 Points
David Paulson 24 Points
Drew Davis 18 Points
Eric Solis 18 Points
D.J. Davis 18 Points
Nate Costa 12 Points
Lavasier Tuinei 12 Points
Daryle Hawkins 12 Points
Malachi Lewis 6 Points
John Boyett 6 Points
Dion Jordan 4 Points
Total Points 613 Points
Defense Totals
978 Total Tackles
96 Tackles for Loss
33 Sacks
21 Interceptions
14 Fumbles Forced

References

External links

 2010 Oregon Football Multimedia Guide

Oregon
Oregon Ducks football seasons
Pac-12 Conference football champion seasons
Oregon Ducks football